Gabriel "Gabi" Aubry (born 3 April 1998) is a French racing driver currently racing in the World Endurance Championship for Vector Sport.

Career

Karting
Born in Saint Germain-en-Laye, Aubry began karting in 2008 at the age of eleven, partaking in events across Europe. One of his karting achievements was the third place in the KFJ class of the Andrea Margutti Trophy, when he finished ahead of such drivers as Jehan Daruvala and Lando Norris.

Formula 4
In 2015, Aubry graduated to single-seaters. He competed in the French F4 Championship, where he won Hungaroring race and had another nine podium finishes. As a result, he finished in the top-three in the overall standings and as runner-up in the International F4 Championship standings.

Formula Renault 2.0
In 2016, Aubry switched to Formula Renault 2.0 with Tech 1 Racing, joining his French F4 rival Sacha Fenestraz. He had six point-scoring finishes and finished eleventh in the drivers' standings. He also had a partial 2016 Formula Renault 2.0 Northern European Cup campaign with the same team.

Aubry continued with Tech 1 in 2017. He won three races—two of them on Hungaroring and one at Spa—and had finished another five races on the podium position. He ended the season fifth. He again competed in the Formula Renault 2.0 Northern European Cup, ending the season fifth as well.

GP3 Series
In January 2018, Aubry joined Arden International for the 2018 GP3 Series campaign.

FIA World Endurance Championship
After two races in the LMP3 Class of the 2017–18 Asian Le Mans Series with win in the season finale at Sepang. In March 2018, Aubry was announced as a Jackie Chan DC Racing driver along with Ho-Pin Tung and Stephane Richelmi in the LMP2 class of the FIA World Endurance Championship. He finished second (eighth overall), behind the G-Drive Racing car which was the invitational entry in the season opener at Spa, taking his first LMP2 win in the World Endurance Championship.

Racing record

Career summary

† Points only counted towards the Michelin Endurance Cup, and not the overall LMP2 Championship.
‡ As Aubry was a guest driver, he was ineligible for championship points.
* Season still in progress.

Complete French F4 Championship results 
(key) (Races in bold indicate pole position) (Races in italics indicate fastest lap)

Complete Formula Renault Eurocup results
(key) (Races in bold indicate pole position) (Races in italics indicate fastest lap)

Complete GP3 Series results
(key) (Races in bold indicate pole position) (Races in italics indicate fastest lap)

Complete FIA World Endurance Championship results
(key) (Races in bold indicate pole position) (Races in italics indicate fastest lap)

* Season still in progress.

Complete 24 Hours of Le Mans results

Complete European Le Mans Series results

‡ Half points awarded as less than 75% of race distance was completed.

Complete IMSA SportsCar Championship results
(key) (Races in bold indicate pole position; races in italics indicate fastest lap)

† Points only counted towards the Michelin Endurance Cup, and not the overall LMP2 Championship.

References

External links
 

1998 births
Living people
Sportspeople from Yvelines
French racing drivers
French F4 Championship drivers
Formula Renault Eurocup drivers
Formula Renault 2.0 NEC drivers
FIA World Endurance Championship drivers
French GP3 Series drivers
24 Hours of Le Mans drivers
24 Hours of Daytona drivers
WeatherTech SportsCar Championship drivers
Arden International drivers
Karting World Championship drivers
Auto Sport Academy drivers
Asian Le Mans Series drivers
European Le Mans Series drivers
Tech 1 Racing drivers
Jota Sport drivers
JDC Motorsports drivers
Starworks Motorsport drivers
Signature Team drivers
AF Corse drivers